The 2018 Formula D season (officially titled Formula DRIFT Black Magic Pro Championship) was the fifteenth season of the Formula D series. The series began on April 7 at Long Beach and concluded on October 13 at Toyota Speedway at Irwindale after eight events. The series celebrated its 100th championship round at Wall Speedway.

Entries

Schedule

Championship standings

Scoring system
Points were awarded for qualifying and for the main event. During qualifying, drivers performed solo runs which were judged on parameters such as line, angle, fluidity and commitment and assigned a numerical score up to 100. These scores were then ranked to determine the qualifying classification and hence populate the brackets for the competition phase. Up to 7 points were then awarded for the top 32 qualifiers.

The qualifiers proceed through a series of competition heats, with those eliminated in the first round (Top 32) receiving 16 points, the second round (Sweet 16) receiving 32 points, the third round (Great 8) receiving 48 points, and the fourth round (Final Four) receiving 64 points and classifying 3rd and 4th. Of the two drivers eliminated in the Final Four, the driver who qualified highest is awarded third place and the final step on the podium. In the Final, the runner-up receives 80 points and the winner 100 points. Final classification within each round is then determined by highest qualifying position; for example, of the two drivers eliminated in the Final Four, the driver who qualified higher is awarded 3rd position and the final place on the podium.

Qualifying stage

Competition stage

Pro Championship standings

Auto Cup standings
Auto Cup points are awarded each round to the two drivers with the highest classified finish for each manufacturer. To be eligible, both the chassis and engine must have been constructed by that manufacturer.

Tire Cup standings
Tire Cup points are awarded each round to the two drivers with the highest classified finish for each tire manufacturer.

Footnotes

References

External links
 

Formula D seasons
Formula D